The Tata Telcoline is a mid-size pickup truck made by the Indian automaker Tata Motors since 1988. In India, it was originally known as the Tatamobile 206, and since 2002, the name was changed to the Tata 207 DI. In export markets, it has been sold as the Tatamobile, Tata Loadbeta, or simply Tata Pick Up.



First generation (1988-2005)

Introduced in July 1988, the Tatamobile 206 pick-up (the original name used in India) was designed and engineered by Telco (Tata Engineering and Locomotive Company) and was the first light commercial vehicle launched by Tata Motors after the heavy duty Tata 407 (a vehicle based on the Mercedes-Benz T2 design). Developed in two years, the pick up sold a total of 61,691 examples in India during the 1988 and 1989 model years and 64,941 vehicles between 1989 and 1990. With the Tatamobile 206, the Indian automaker acquired 25% of the market share in the light commercial vehicle segment.

The Tatamobile 206 is a mid-size pick-up produced on a flexible body-on-frame chassis (called Tata X2 platform) in both short wheelbase (single cab, 2 seats) and long wheelbase (crew cab, 5 seats) with rear or four wheel drive: the 4WD version has a higher ground clearance for improved off-road use. On the same X2 platform, Tata Motors produced the compact 3-door Tata Sierra SUV (launched in 1991),  the 5-door Tata Estate wagon and the 5-door Safari SUV, Sumo and Spacio. Originally in India, it was powered by a naturally aspirated 2.0-litre (1,948 cc) diesel Peugeot XD88 engine (assembled under licence by Tata in India) that produced . In 1994, a Tata-built, stroked version of the unrelated Peugeot XUD9 engine with the same displacement as the old XD88 was added. A turbocharged version that produced  was also available.

In 1990, Tata started exporting the Tatamobile to South Africa with the name Telcoline and in 1994, Tata introduced a facelift for the Indian market with revised headlights. Tata also began exporting the vehicle to Europe. In Italy, it was sold as the Tata Pick-Up in single and crew-cab form with two trim levels: base level and Orciari, a more equipped version built by Italian firm Orciari with two-tone paint, front bull-bar, alloy wheels, air conditioning and a more refined interior. The engines available in Europe were the 2.0-litre Peugeot naturally aspirated diesel (63 HP) and turbo diesel (92 HP). With the introduction of the Euro 3 emission standards, the naturally aspirated version was phased out and the power of the turbocharged version was reduced to 88 horsepower.

In 2000, Tata Motors signed an agreement with Malaysia Truck & Bus (MTB) to assemble the Telcoline in complete knock down kit form at the Pekan, Pahang plant in Malaysia for sale on the local market. The pick-up was initially sold only in the 4WD double-cab version, though later on, the single-cab version was also introduced.

2002 facelift

In August 2002, a more substantial facelift was introduced: new front and rear bumpers, bonnet and front grille that houses the new Tata logo. Moreover, changes are made to the mechanicals and the new 3.0-litre diesel engine is introduced (the same used in the Tata 407). With the new engine, Tata changed the Indian market name from Tatamobile to Tata 207 DI. The 3.0-litre (2956 cc) naturally aspirated diesel produced 58 HP but had more torque than the outgoing 2.0-litre Peugeot unit, while the turbocharged version produced 87 HP and was homologated to meet Euro 4 regulations.

In September 2003, a joint venture was signed between Tata Motors and Phoenix Venture Holdings (MG Rover group) for the distribution and sale of the Tata 207 DI in the United Kingdom. In 2006 Tata introduced to the Indian market the 207 DI EX, a single cab version with flat load body and long wheelbase. In Europe the new 2.2 litre Dicor turbodiesel common rail engine Euro 4 that produce 140 horsepower was introduced. The 2.2-litre was based on the design of the 2,179 cc PSA DW12 engine and was re-engineered by Tata and AVL.

In 2005, for the first time, Tata introduced the four-wheel drive version of the Telcoline in India. It had previously only been produced for export markets. In India, the 4WD version was sold as the Tata TL, the rear-wheel drive version continued as the Tata 207. In 2008, export to Europe had ended, with Tata announcing its successor, the Xenon pick-up.

Today, production continues in India with exports to South Africa.

Second generation (2006–present)

Developed in 18 months, the new generation of the Tata pickup uses an evolution of the previous body-on-frame X2 platform. Revised above all in the suspension geometry, the body uses a higher percentage of high-strength steel. Given the success of the previous Telcoline, the new generation Tata realises a product intended primarily for export to many countries including ASEAN, EMEA and Merconsur. It is equipped with double front airbags and security systems such as ABS, traction control and downhill speed control. During the development phase, it was called the TL Sprint due to reduced industrialisation times. Following the launch, ESP stability control was also introduced for export.

The presentation took place in the form of a definitive prototype at the Bologna Motor Show in December 2006, with production starting in May 2007 at the Pune plant (India) and thereafter beginning sales in India, Europe and South Africa. The final name chosen by Tata Motors is Xenon to avoid confusion with the previous Telcoline remaining in production. In Europe, it is equipped with the new 2.2-litre Dicor turbodiesel common rail Euro 4 producing 140 horsepower and a 5-speed manual gearbox.

In India, its revised X2 platform also gave rise to the Tata Sumo Grande.

In 2012, with the introduction of the Euro 5 regulations in Europe, the 2.2 Dicor engine was revised with the introduction of VGT, DPF filter and a power rise to 150 horsepower.

In 2010, the pick up started assembly in Thailand by the Tata-Thonburi joint venture. In 2011, the CNG version was launched in Thailand powered by a new 2,1 litre straight-4 DOHC engine with 115 HP.
A Xenon XT (Cross Terrain) double cab 4-door, 5-seater variant was launched in 2009. The Xenon has been well received in Europe, especially in Spain and Italy.

Sales

References

External links

  Tata Pickup Trucks - Tata Motors

1980s cars
1990s cars
2000s cars
2010s cars
All-wheel-drive vehicles
Cars introduced in 1988
First car made by manufacturer
Pickup trucks
Rear-wheel-drive vehicles
Tata cars
Tata trucks